Emneth is a village and civil parish in the English county of Norfolk.

History
Emneth's name is of Anglo-Saxon origin and derives from the Old English for Eana's meeting place or meadow.

Emneth is note featured in the Domesday Book, likely because in the late-Eleventh Century this area of Norfolk was still flooded.

Emneth was the site of Hagbeach Hall, a Medieval manor house demolished in 1887.

Geography
According to the 2011 Census, Emneth has a population of 2,617 residents living in 1,150 households.

Emneth falls within the constituency of South West Norfolk and is represented at Parliament by Liz Truss MP of the Conservative Party. For the purposes of local government, the parish falls within the district of King's Lynn and West Norfolk.

The boundaries of the parish also includes the hamlets of Emneth Hungate and Holly End.

St. Edmund's Church
Emneth's parish church is dedicated to Saint Edmund and dates from the Fifteenth Century on the site of earlier Christian worship, the church is a good example of the architecture of the Perpendicular style. St. Edmund's has good examples of Eighteenth Century stained-glass installed by Clayton and Bell and William Wailes. One of the stained-glass roundels in the church depicts Thomas the Tank Engine, in commemoration of Rev. W. V. Awdry who served as Vicar of Emneth from 1953 to 1965. St. Edmund's also has a good example of Bell-cot with six bells and Angels and the Apostles carved into the tiebeams and hammerbeans.

Transport
Emneth railway station opened in 1848 as a stop on the Bramley Line between Watlington and Peterborough railway station. The station closed in 1968 as a result of the Beeching cuts, however, the railway infrastructure still remains as a private residence. Today, the nearest railway station is at Downham Market for the Fen Line between King's Lynn and Peterborough. 

Emneth is bisected by the A47 between Birmingham and Lowestoft and the nearest airport is Cambridge International Airport.

Notable Residents
 Sir Henry Peyton, 2nd Baronet (1779-1854)- English politician
 Rev. W. V. Awdry (1911-1997)- English clergyman and children's author
 Tony Martin (b.1944)- English farmer

War Memorial
Emneth's war memorial takes the form of a stone column topped with a small Celtic cross located inside St. Edmund's Churchyard. The memorial lists the following names for the First World War:

 Capt. John A. Markham (1887-1915), 1st Battalion, East Yorkshire Regiment
 2nd-Lt. Leonard W. Brooks (1885-1917), No. 2 Squadron RFC
 Sgt. John H. Claxton (d.1915), 1st Battalion, Royal Norfolk Regiment
 Sgt. Frederick Neal (1883-1915), 1st Battalion, Suffolk Regiment
 Sgt. Frederick Day (d.1916), 2nd Battalion, Suffolk Regiment
 Cpl. Robert Lines (d.1916), Royal Field Artillery att. 11th (Northern) Division
 L-Cpl. Archibald B. Crofts (1890-1916), 2nd Battalion, King's Royal Rifle Corps
 L-Cpl. Ernest A. Edwards (1891-1917), 2/4th Battalion, Lincolnshire Regiment
 L-Cpl. Reginald V. Green (1897-1918), 1st Battalion, Middlesex Regiment
 Dvr. John Chase (d.1918), 72nd Brigade, Royal Field Artillery
 Pte. George Laws (1892-1918), 1st Battalion, Bedfordshire Regiment
 Pte. Len Brown (d.1917), 1/1st Battalion, Cambridgeshire Regiment
 Pte. Oliver Hunter (1898-1918), 1/1st Battalion, Cambridgeshire Regiment
 Pte. Arthur Roper (1895-1915), 1/1st Battalion, Cambridgeshire Regiment
 Pte. George W. Hurst (1900-1919), 8th Battalion, East Surrey Regiment
 Pte. Harry Glover (d.1916), 4th Battalion, Grenadier Guards
 Pte. Stanley H. C. Long (1895-1917), 2nd Battalion, Hampshire Regiment
 Pte. Thomas Sharp (1888-1918), Agricultural Company, Labour Corps
 Pte. Samuel F. Balderson (1895-1916), 7th Battalion, Lincolnshire Regiment
 Pte. Frank Moyses (d.1918), 3rd Company, Machine Gun Corps
 Pte. Samuel Stokes (1895-1917), 25th Company, Machine Gun Corps
 Pte. Charles W. Brewington (1896-1917), 16th (Public Schools) Battalion, Middlesex Regiment
 Pte. William Hanslip (1881-1916), 9th Battalion, Royal Norfolk Regiment
 Pte. Sydney E. Killingsworth (d.1918), 2nd Battalion, Northamptonshire Regiment
 Pte. Arthur Hurst (1893-1918), 5th Battalion, Northamptonshire Regiment
 Pte. William B. Smith MM (1899-1916), 2nd Battalion, Suffolk Regiment
 Pte. William Jackson (d.1917), 5th Battalion, Suffolk Regiment

And, the following for the Second World War:

 Cpt. Harold M. R. Norton (1922-1945), Glider Pilot Regiment
 F/O. Arthur R. Ludlow (1922-1943), No. 44 Squadron RAF
 Sgt. Neville W. Carlile (1917-1940), No. 82 Squadron RAF
 L-Cpl. Walter H. White (1913-1944), Royal Military Police
 Dvr. Joseph L. Mason (d.1944), Royal Army Medical Corps
 Dvr. Frank Farrow (1918-1944), Royal Army Service Corps
 Gnr. Robert Bruce (1919-1944), 55th (Suffolk Yeomanry) Anti-Tank Regiment, Royal Artillery
 Pte. Charles H. Baxter (1918-1942), 2nd Battalion, Cambridgeshire Regiment
 Pte. Leslie Wabe (1906-1944), 7th Battalion, Cheshire Regiment
 Pte. Richard R. Neal (1920-1943), 6th Battalion, Royal Norfolk Regiment
 Pte. Percy I. White (1909-1944), 2nd Battalion, Suffolk Regiment
 Vera M. Matthews (1920-1944), Women's Royal Air Force

Gallery

References

Further reading
Mee, A. (1972). The King's England: Norfolk. London: Hodder and Stoughton, p.87.

External links

Villages in Norfolk
King's Lynn and West Norfolk
Civil parishes in Norfolk